Charles Richard Marshall (2 March 1886 – 23 August 1947) was a British rugby union player who competed in the 1908 Summer Olympics. He was a member of the British rugby union team, which won the silver medal.

References

External links

Charlie Marshall's profile at databaseOlympics
Charlie Marshall's profile at Sports Reference.com

1886 births
1947 deaths
British rugby union players
Rugby union players at the 1908 Summer Olympics
Olympic rugby union players of Great Britain
Olympic silver medallists for Great Britain
Cornish rugby union players
Medalists at the 1908 Summer Olympics